Kakabhushundi, also rendered Bhushundi, is a sage featured in Hindu literature. He is one of the characters of the Rāmacaritamānasa, an Awadhi poem about the deity Rama by the saint Tulsidas. 

Kakabhushundi is depicted as a devotee of Rama, who narrates the story of the Ramayana to Garuda in the form of a crow. He is described to be one of the Chiranjivis, an immortal being in Hinduism who is to remain alive on earth until the end of the current Kali Yuga.

Etymology 
Kāka refers to a Sanskrit word for crow, while bhuśuṇḍi is a kind of a weapon.

Legend

Ramacharitamanasa 
Kakabhushundi was originally a member of the Shudra class of Ayodhya. A zealous devotee of the deity Shiva, he held the deity Vishnu and Vaishnavas in contempt, despite his guru's efforts to discourage him from this mindset. Once, Kakabhushundi refused to offer his respects to his guru while he was engaged in prayer to Shiva in a temple.  Angered, Shiva cursed his ungrateful devotee to take the form of a snake, and live a thousand lives as a lesser creature. After his guru prayed to the deity to moderate the curse, Shiva stated that after his thousand cursed births, Kakabhushundi would become a devotee of Rama. The deity also warned him never to displease a preceptor ever again. Accordingly, following the cursed births, Kakabhushundi was born as a Brahmana, and grew to become a great follower of Rama and a sage. While listening to the discourse to a sage named Lomasha on the merits of nirguna (non-qualified Absolute) worship over that of saguna (qualified Absolute) worship of Brahman, he refused to accept these views. In his fury, Lomasha cursed him to become a crow.

The sage told Garuda that every Treta Yuga, he goes to Ayodhya and stays in the city for five years, watching the child Rama as a crow. Once, Rama tried to catch him with all the antics of an excited child. A moment of doubt regarding Rama's divinity occurred in the sage's mind. When Kakabhushundi soared towards the sky, he realised that the deity's fingers were always mere fingerbreadths away from him, even when he flew all the way to Brahmaloka. When he opened his eyes, he found himself back in Ayodhya amid the laughing child. He witnessed a cosmic vision in Rama's mouth, observing millions of suns and moons within, and a vision of the sage himself in Ayodhya within each celestial object. He resided within each of these realms for centuries, and returned from Rama's mouth to find himself return to the same moment in time as he had left. Bewildered, he begged for Rama's salvation, and was promptly blessed with the same. He chose to forever remain in the form of a crow as he had been blessed by his favoured deity in that form.

References 

Hindu sages